Mourad Ainy (born 24 March 1980) is a Moroccan football defender, who currently plays for Kawkab Marrakech.

He received first cap at the friendly match against Belgium on March 26, 2008.

References

External links

1980 births
Moroccan footballers
Morocco international footballers
Living people
Raja CA players
Difaâ Hassani El Jadidi players
Kawkab Marrakech players
Al Wahda FC players
UAE Pro League players
Association football defenders